Pterodon may refer to:
 Pteranodon, a pterosaur, sometimes misspelled as "Pterodon"
 Pterodon (mammal), an extinct genus of mammals
 Pterodon (plant), a genus of legumes in the family Fabaceae

 Pterodon (company), a Czech game developer